Ross Steven Marshall (born 9 October 1999) is an English professional footballer who plays for National League club Torquay United. He plays in both central defence and as a defensive midfielder.

Marshall started his career in the academy at Broxbourne Borough before joining Ipswich Town in 2014. Whilst in Ipswich's academy, he had two youth loan spells; firstly at Lowestoft Town in 2018 and then at Braintree Town a year later. Marshall was not offered a professional contract by Ipswich and subsequently signed for National League South club Maidstone United in October 2019. After spending the 2019–20 season at Maidstone, he joined Stevenage of League Two in July 2020.

Career

Early career
Marshall began his career playing in the academy for Broxbourne Borough in the Eastern Junior Alliance before joining Ipswich Town's youth system in July 2014. He became a full-time academy player at Ipswich when he signed a two-year scholarship in July 2016. Whilst still in Ipswich's academy, Marshall was loaned out to Lowestoft Town on 16 March 2018, joining on a youth loan for the remainder of the 2017–18 season. At the end of that season, in July 2018, Marshall's scholarship at Ipswich was extended for a further year, running until June 2019. He was sent out on loan to National League club Braintree Town in January 2019, although he did not make any appearances for the club during the loan agreement. Marshall was released by Ipswich after not being offered a professional contract in June 2019.

Maidstone United
Following his release from Ipswich, Marshall signed a one-year deal with National League South club Maidstone United on 11 October 2019. The move meant that he would be playing under the management of Hakan Hayrettin, who had previously managed Marshall during his loan spell at Braintree. Marshall made his Maidstone debut a day after signing, playing the whole match in a 1–1 draw away at Bath City. He scored his first goal for the club in a 4–1 home victory over Dulwich Hamlet on 28 December 2019. Marshall went on to make 25 appearances in all competitions throughout the 2019–20 season, scoring once.

Stevenage
After one season at Maidstone, Marshall signed for League Two club Stevenage on 10 July 2020. He made his debut in the club's 3–0 home victory over Oldham Athletic on 19 September 2020, coming on as an 87th-minute substitute in the match. Marshall joined National League club Barnet on loan on 18 February 2022, signing an agreement until the end of the 2021–22 season. He made 18 appearances during his loan at Barnet before returning to Stevenage, who made him available for transfer at the end of the season.

Torquay
On the 5th July 2022, Marshall signed for National League club Torquay United.

Style of play
He has played as both a central defender and a defensive midfielder during his career. Upon signing for Stevenage, manager Alex Revell described Marshall as a "strong, combative defensive midfielder".

Career statistics

References

External links

1999 births
Living people
English footballers
Association football defenders
Association football midfielders
Ipswich Town F.C. players
Lowestoft Town F.C. players
Braintree Town F.C. players
Maidstone United F.C. players
Stevenage F.C. players
Barnet F.C. players
Torquay United F.C. players
English Football League players
National League (English football) players
Isthmian League players